Paulo Santos Carvalho (born 26 February 1986) is a Brazilian amateur flyweight boxer who won a bronze medal at the 2006 South American Games. He competed at the 2008 Summer Olympics but was eliminated in the third bout.

Career

World Series of Boxing record

References

External links

Qualifier
Bio
Profile

1986 births
Living people
Sportspeople from Salvador, Bahia
Light-flyweight boxers
Boxers at the 2008 Summer Olympics
Olympic boxers of Brazil
Brazilian male boxers
South American Games bronze medalists for Brazil
South American Games medalists in boxing
Competitors at the 2006 South American Games